Shilpa Prabhakar Satish I.A.S  Collector and District Magistrate, is an officer of the Indian administrative service. She is the 215th collector and the first women collector of Tirunelveli district. She took charge of her office in May 2018, and is known for her bats for Anganwadi, a rural childcare centre in India and to set an example for the public she admitted her 3-year-old daughter to Anganwadi which was welcomed by the people all over India.

Early life 

Shilpa Prabhakar Satish was born in Karnataka on 30 August 1981 and graduated in Law from Bangalore University and she had scored 46th rank in the All India UPSC (union public service commission) examination.

Career as civil servant 
She was the  Assistant Collector in Tiruchirapalli district in 2010
Sub Collector for Tirupattur subdivision of Vellore district between 2011 and 2014
Deputy Commissioner (Education) at Chennai Corporation for a year
Executive Vice Chairperson for Industries Guidance and Export Promotion Bureau, Industries department Chennai
District Collector of Thirunelveli from May 2018 https://tirunelveli.nic.in/collector-profile/

Awards

Shilpa Prabhakar Satish in the year 2019 received the Tamil Nadu Pollution Control Board's ‘Special Award for Effective Implementation of Plastic Ban’ from Chief Minister Edappadi K. Palaniswami in Chennai on Thursday. 

In 2019 received Digital transformation award

References

Women from Tamil Nadu
Indian government officials
Living people
1981 births